Ronald Raphael Coifman is the Sterling professor of Mathematics at Yale University. Coifman earned a doctorate from the University of Geneva in 1965, supervised by Jovan Karamata.

Coifman is a member of the American Academy of Arts and Sciences, the Connecticut Academy of Science and Engineering, and the National Academy of Sciences. He is a recipient of the 1996 DARPA Sustained Excellence Award, the 1996 Connecticut Science Medal, the 1999 Pioneer Award of the International Society for Industrial and Applied Science, and the 1999 National Medal of Science.

In 2013, he co-founded ThetaRay, a cyber security and big data analytics company.

In 2018, he received the Rolf Schock Prize for Mathematics.

References

External links 
 Scientific Data Has Become So Complex, We Have to Invent New Math to Deal With It, Wired

Members of the United States National Academy of Sciences
Living people
20th-century American mathematicians
21st-century American mathematicians
Israeli Jews
Israeli mathematicians
Yale University faculty
National Medal of Science laureates
1941 births
Israeli emigrants to the United States